Samuel Ersson (born 20 October 1999) is a Swedish professional ice hockey goaltender for the  Philadelphia Flyers of the National Hockey League (NHL). He was drafted by the Flyers in the fifth round of the 2018 NHL Entry Draft.

Playing career
Ersson played as a youth with Falu IF before joining the Brynäs IF organization of the Swedish Hockey League (SHL) as a 16-year old.

Ersson was awarded the Guldgallret, which recognizes the best junior player in the HockeyAllsvenskan, for his play with VIK Västerås HK during the 2018–19 season. He signed a contract to return to the Brynäs organization for the 2019–20 season.

On 4 June 2021, Ersson was signed by the Philadelphia Flyers to a three-year, entry-level contract.

Ersson made his NHL debut on 23 December 2022, in a 6–5 loss to the Carolina Hurricanes. He would get pulled in the second period to be put back in later in the game, however Carter Hart would be handed the loss. Ersson got his first NHL win on 29 December, in a 4–3 overtime win over the San Jose Sharks, and would get his first shutout against the Buffalo Sabres on 9 January 2023.

Career statistics

Regular season and playoffs

International

References

External links
 

1999 births
Living people
Brynäs IF players
Lehigh Valley Phantoms players
People from Falun
Philadelphia Flyers draft picks
Philadelphia Flyers players
Sportspeople from Dalarna County
Swedish ice hockey goaltenders
VIK Västerås HK players